The 1925–26 Scottish Division One season was won by Celtic by eight points over nearest rival Airdrieonians. Raith Rovers and Clydebank finished 19th and 20th respectively and were relegated to the 1926–27 Scottish Division Two.

League table

Results

References 

 Statto.com

1925–26 Scottish Football League
Scottish Division One seasons